The Idaho High School Activities Association (IHSAA) oversees high school athletics and activities in the state of Idaho. Idaho high schools are classified in five categories, based on enrollment, for league competition and state playoffs and championships. The IHSAA recognizes 18 specific sports.

Schools primarily compete within their own classification for regular season play, but are allowed to play other schools one classification above or below them in most sports.

Classification 
IHSAA classifications are based on four-year enrollments (grades 9–12).The classifications for the state's 161 high schools for 2018–20 are:

Historic classifications

Source:

 A-1 was split into two divisions for football in fall 1984, all sports in fall 2000 
 1A was two divisions for football only; two divisions for volleyball and basketball in fall 2008.

Districts

The six districts correspond to those used by the state's transportation department.

5A Conferences 

High Country Conference (5A) - (east)
Highland Rams - (Pocatello)
Idaho Falls Tigers
Madison Bobcats - (Rexburg)
Rigby Trojans
Thunder Ridge Titans - (Idaho Falls)
Inland Empire League (5A)  - (north)
Coeur d'Alene Vikings
Lake City Timberwolves - (Coeur d'Alene)
Lewiston Bengals
Post Falls Trojans

Southern Idaho Conference (5A) - (southwest)
Boise Brave
Borah Lions - (Boise)
Capital Eagles - (Boise)
Centennial Patriots - (Boise, W. Ada S.D.)
Eagle Mustangs - (Eagle, W. Ada S.D.)
Kuna Kaveman
Meridian Warriors - (Meridian, W. Ada S.D.)
Mountain View Mavericks - (Meridian, W. Ada S.D.)
Owyhee Storm - (Meridian, W. Ada S.D.)''
Rocky Mountain Grizzlies - (Meridian, W. Ada S.D.)
Skyview Hawks - (Nampa)
Timberline Wolves - (Boise)

4A Conferences 

High Country Conference (4A) - (East-VI)
Blackfoot Broncos
Bonneville Bees - (Idaho Falls)
Hillcrest Knights - (Ammon)
Skyline Grizzlies - (Idaho Falls)
Shelley Russets
Great Basin Conference - (South Central-IV)
Burley Bobcats
Canyon Ridge Riverhawks - (Twin Falls)
Jerome Tigers
Minico Spartans - (Rupert)
Mountain Home Tigers
Twin Falls Bruins
Wood River Wolverines - (Hailey)
Great Basin Conference - (Southeast-V)
Pocatello Thunder
Century Diamondbacks - (Inkom)
Preston Indians

Inland Empire League (4A) - (North-I & II)
Lakeland Hawks - (Rathdrum)
Moscow Bears
Sandpoint Bulldogs
Southern Idaho Conference (4A) - (Southwest-III)
Bishop Kelly Knights - (Boise)
Caldwell Cougars
Columbia Wildcats - (Nampa)
Emmett Huskies
Middleton Vikings
Nampa Bulldogs
Ridgevue Warhawks - (Nampa in Vallivue S.D.)
Vallivue Falcons - (Caldwell in Vallivue S.D.)

3A Conferences 

Intermountain League - (north)
Bonners Ferry Badgers
Coeur d' Alene Charter Panthers
Timberlake Tigers - (Spirit Lake)
Mountain Rivers Conference  - (east)
South Fremont Cougars - (St. Anthony)
Sugar-Salem Diggers
Teton Timberwolves - (Driggs)
Sawtooth Central Conference - (south central)
Buhl Indians
Filer Wildcats
Gooding Senators
Kimberly Bulldogs

Snake River Valley Conference - (southwest)
Fruitland Grizzlies
Homedale Trojans
Parma Panthers
Payette Pirates
McCall-Donnelly Vandals
Sage International School
Weiser Wolverines
Southeastern Idaho Conference - (southeast)
American Falls Beavers
Marsh Valley Eagles - (Arimo)
Snake River Panthers - (Blackfoot)

2A Conferences 

Canyon Conference - (south central)
Declo Hornets
Wendell Trojans
Valley Vikings - (Hazelton)
Community Cutthroat Trout - (Sun Valley)
Central Idaho League - (north central)
Grangeville Bulldogs
Kellogg Wildcats
Orofino Maniacs
Priest River Spartans
St. Maries Lumberjacks
Nuclear Conference - (east)
Firth Cougars
North Fremont Huskies - (Ashton)
Ririe Bulldogs
Salmon Savages
West Jefferson Panthers - (Terreton)

Southeastern Idaho Conference - (southeast)
Aberdeen Tigers
Bear Lake Bears - (Montpelier)
Malad Dragons 
Soda Springs Cardinals
West Side Pirates - (Dayton)
Western Idaho Conference - (southwest)
Ambrose Archers - (Meridian)
Cole Valley Christian Chargers - (Meridian)
Compass Aviators - (Meridian)
Marsing Huskies
Melba Mustangs
Nampa Christian Trojans
New Plymouth Pilgrims
North Star Huskies - (Eagle)

1A Conferences

Division I

Snake River Conference - (south central)
Butte County Pirates - (Arco)
Challis Vikings
Glenns Ferry Pilots
Hagerman Pirates
Oakley Hornets
Raft River Trojans - (Malta)
Shoshone Indians
White Pine League (Div I) - (north central)
Clearwater Valley Rams - (Kooskia)
Genesee Bulldogs
Kamiah Kubs
Lapwai Wildcats
Potlatch Loggers
Prairie Pirates - (Cottonwood)
Troy Trojans

Western Idaho Conference - (southwest)
Centennial Mustangs - (Caldwell)
Gem State Jaguars - (Caldwell)
Greenleaf Grizzlies
Idaho City Wildcats
Liberty Charter Patriots - (Nampa)
Notus Pirates
Rimrock Raiders - (Grand View)
Riverstone International Otters - (Boise)
Victory Vipers - (Nampa)
Vision Charter Golden Eagles - (Caldwell)
Wilder Wildcats - (Wilder)

Division II

Long Pin Conference - (southwest)

Cascade Ramblers 
Council Lumberjacks
Garden Valley Wolverines
Horseshoe Bend Mustangs
Meadows Valley Mountaineers - (New Meadows)

Salmon River Savages - (Riggins)
Tri-Valley Titans - (Cambridge/ Midvale/ Indian Valley)

Sawtooth Conference - (south central)
Bliss Bears
Camas County Musher Dogs - (Fairfield)
Carey Panthers
Castleford Wolves
Dietrich Blue Devils
Hansen Huskies
Lighthouse Christian Lions - (Twin Falls)
Murtaugh Red Devils
Richfield Tigers

White Pine League (Div II) - (north central)
Culdesac Wolves
Deary Mustangs
Highland Huskies - (Craigmont)
Kendrick Tigers
Logos Knights  - (Moscow)
Nezperce Indians
St. John Bosco Patriots  - (Cottonwood)
Timberline Spartans - (Weippe)
North Star Conference - (north)
Clark Fork Wampus Cats
Genesis Prep Jaguars - (Post Falls)
Kootenai Warriors
Lakeside Knights - (Plummer)
Mullan Tigers 
Wallace Miners - (1A Div I)
Rocky Mountain Conference - (central)
Clark County Bobcats - (Dubois)
Grace Grizzlies
Leadore Mustangs
Mackay Miners 
North Gem Cowboys - (Bancroft)
Rockland Bulldogs 
Sho-Ban Chiefs - (Fort Hall)
Grace Lutheran Royals  - (Pocatello)
 Watersprings Warriors - (Idaho Falls, Idaho)

Neighboring states

Washington Interscholastic Activities Association
Oregon School Activities Association
Nevada Interscholastic Activities Association

Montana High School Association
Wyoming High School Activities Association
Utah High School Activities Association

See also
 NFHS

References

External links 

Sports in Idaho
Education in Idaho
High school sports associations in the United States